Knoxieae is a tribe of flowering plants in the family Rubiaceae and contains about 131 species in 16 genera. Its representatives are found in Tropical and Southern Africa, the islands in the Western Indian Ocean, the Arabian Peninsula, Tropical and Subtropical Asia, and Northern Australia.

Genera 
Currently accepted names

 Batopedina Verdc. (3 sp)
 Carphalea Juss. (3 sp)
 Chamaepentas Bremek. (6 sp)
 Dirichletia Klotzsch (5 sp)
 Dolichopentas Kårehed & B.Bremer (4 sp)
 Knoxia L. (13 sp)
 Otiophora Zucc. (18 sp)
 Otomeria Benth. (8 sp)
 Paracarphalea Razafimandimbison, Ferm, B.Bremer & Kårehed (3 sp)
 Paraknoxia Bremek. (1 sp)
 Parapentas Bremek. (3 sp)
 Pentanisia Harv. (19 sp)
 Pentas Benth. (16 sp)
 Phyllopentas (Verdc.) Kårehed & B.Bremer (14 sp)
 Rhodopentas Kårehed & B.Bremer (2 sp)
 Triainolepis Hook.f. (13 sp)

Synonyms

 Afroknoxia Verdc. = Knoxia
 Baumannia K.Schum. = Knoxia
 Calanda K.Schum. = Pentanisia
 Chlorochorion Puff & Robbr. = Pentanisia
 Cuncea Buch.-Ham. ex D.Don = Knoxia
 Dentillaria Kuntze = Knoxia
 Diotocarpus Hochst. = Pentanisia
 Holocarpa Baker = Pentanisia
 Mericocalyx Bamps = Otiophora
 Neobaumannia Hutch. & Dalziel = Knoxia
 Neopentanisia Verdc. = Pentanisia
 Neurocarpaea R.Br. ex Hiern = Pentas
 Neurocarpaea R.Br. = Pentas
 Orthostemma Wall. ex Voigt = Pentas
 Otocephalus Chiov. = Pentanisia
 Paratriaina Bremek. = Triainolepis
 Pentacarpaea Hiern = Pentanisia
 Pentacarpus Post & Kuntze = Pentanisia
 Placopoda Balf.f. = Dirichletia
 Princea Dubard & Dop = Triainolepis
 Tapinopentas Bremek. = Otomeria
 Thyridocalyx Bremek. = Triainolepis
 Vignaldia A.Rich. = Pentas
 Vissadali Adans. = Knoxia

References 

 
Rubioideae tribes